Birmingham Interchange is a planned High Speed 2 railway station in the Metropolitan Borough of Solihull, West Midlands, England, expected to open in 2026.

Unlike the city centre based Birmingham Curzon Street railway station, the interchange station will be a parkway, serving the east side of Birmingham and surrounding urban areas.

The station will be built on a triangular piece of land, surrounded by the M42 motorway, A446 and A45, and will be  linked to the National Exhibition Centre, Birmingham Airport and Birmingham International railway station by a people mover. The people mover will have a capacity of over 2,100 passengers per hour in each direction in the peak period.

History 
The station was designed by Arup, with support from Churchman Thornhill Finch, achieving BREEAM ‘Outstanding’ certification, the first railway station in the world to do so, with measures to maximise daylight, LED lighting, reusing rainwater from its roof, and air source heat pumps. In June 2021, High Speed 2 invited companies to bid for a £370million contract to build the station. 

Skanska, Unity (a joint venture with Sir Robert McAlpine and VolkerFitzpatrick, with support from WSP) and Laing O’Rourke were shortlisted. Laing O’Rourke was subsequently awarded the contract in July 2022 for its detailed design and following this, its construction starting in 2023.

The station will have 4 platforms, made of two 415m long platform islands. There will also be capacity for through-running services on two centrally placed tracks, leading to a total of 6 tracks. The station structure will be formed by a steel and glulam timber frame, with repeating structural forms on a 9 by 9 grid.

Services
Current service proposals suggest five trains per hour will stop at Birmingham Interchange, in each direction. Journey time from this station to London is planned to be 38minutes.

Transport links

References 

High Speed 2
Proposed railway stations in England
Solihull